Annelies Verlinden (born 5 September 1978) is a Belgian politician. , she is the Minister of the Interior, Institutional Reforms, and Democratic Renewal in the De Croo Government led by Prime Minister Alexander De Croo. Verlinden is a member of the Christen-Democratisch en Vlaams party.

References 

Living people
1978 births
People from Merksem
Politicians from Antwerp
Interior ministers of Belgium
Women government ministers of Belgium
Christian Democratic and Flemish politicians
21st-century Belgian women politicians
21st-century Belgian politicians
Female interior ministers